Foothill fleabane is a common name for several plants and may refer to:

Erigeron consimilis, native to the western United States
Erigeron mariposanus, endemic to California